Huta Gogołowska  is a village in the administrative district of Gmina Frysztak, within Strzyżów County, Subcarpathian Voivodeship, in south-eastern Poland.

The village has a population of 240.

References

External links
 Huta Gogołowska in Poland

Villages in Strzyżów County